The professional world rankings for snooker players in the 1985–86 season are listed below.

The tournaments that counted towards these rankings were those which were open to all professional players over three seasons. These tournaments were the Jameson International Open 1982, 1983 and 1984; the Professional Players Tournament 1982 and 1983, and 1984 Rothmans Grand Prix; the 1984 UK Championship; the 1984 Lada Classic and 1985 Mercantile Credit Classic; the 1985 Dulux British Open; and the 1983, 1984 and 1985 Embassy World Championships. Steve Davis was ranked first of the 102 players included.

Points tariff 
In additional to standard ranking points awarded as per the table below, a "merit" point was awarded for losers in the last 32 of the World Championship, and a half merit point awarded to losers in the last 32 of other ranking tournaments. No points were awarded to a player who did not win any matches in a given tournament.  (For example, a top 16 player seeded into the last 32 of the world championship would not win any merit points if they lost their first match.) Merit points were only used to determine placings between players that had an equal opportunity to earn them. Players ranked from 77 to 102 had no ranking or merit points, with their positions determined by their performances in the 1985 World Snooker Championship, with frames won being taken into consideration if the round reached was equal.

Rankings

Notes

References

1985
Rankings 1986
Rankings 1985